Retribution is a 1969 Soviet drama film directed by Aleksandr Stolper.

Plot 
The film tells about the heroes of the Battle of Stalingrad, which are united by an incredibly strong desire for victory...

Cast 
 Kirill Lavrov as Ivan Sinzov
 Anatoliy Papanov as General Serpilin
 Lyudmila Krylova as Tanja Ovsyannikova
 Aleksandr Plotnikov as Kuzmich
 Yuri Stoskov as Levashov
 Yuri Vizbor as Zakharov
 Grigoriy Gay as Berezhnoy (as Grigori Gaj)
 Sergey Shakurov as Ilyin

References

External links 
 

1969 films
1960s Russian-language films
Soviet drama films
1969 drama films